Steinhöfel is a municipality in the Oder-Spree district, in Brandenburg, Germany. Since the beginning of 2019 it belongs to the collective municipality "Amt Odervorland"

In 1774, the Prussian Minister of War and Treasury Joachim von Blumenthal purchased the estate of Steinhöfel, including a manor that was later expanded into a castle. When von Blumenthal died, the estate was inherited by his daughter Charlotte von Massow, whose husband the Court Marshal Valentin von Massow commissioned a rebuilding of the manor by the architect David Gilly. The property was inherited in turn by the couple's son Valentin von Massow who had served with Wellington in Spain and as one of his adjutants at Waterloo.

During the Seven Years' War, the castle's surroundings saw a brief visit by Frederick the Great resting his troops prior to the Battle of Kunersdorf. Later recreational visitors included Frederick William III of Prussia and Theodor Fontane who expressed considerable enthusiasm about the place.

The castle (de:Schloß Steinhöfel) today hosts a hotel and commercial venue under Cultural heritage regulations.

The contemporary municipality of Steinhöfel comprises a total of twelve physical villages including Steinhöfel, Demnitz and Neuendorf im Sande.

Demography

References

Localities in Oder-Spree